Wu Junbao (born 1965) is a lieutenant general in the People's Liberation Army of China.

He is an alternate member of the 20th Central Committee of the Chinese Communist Party.

Biography
Wu was born in Qianjiang County (now Qianjiang), Hubei, in 1965. 

He once served as commander of the 14th Division of the Air Force Aviation Corps of the Nanjing Military Region. He was commander of Shanghai Air Force Base in 2013, and held that office until 2017, when he deputy commander of the  Central Theater Command Air Force. He was assistant to the chief of staff of the Joint Staff Department of the Central Military Commission in early 2021 and subsequently deputy commander of the Eastern Theater Command and commander of the Eastern Theater Command Air Force in December of that same year.

He was promoted to the rank of major general (shaojiang) in December 2014 and lieutenant general (zhongjiang) in December 2021.

References

1965 births
Living people
People from Qianjiang
People's Liberation Army generals from Hubei
People's Republic of China politicians from Hubei
Chinese Communist Party politicians from Hubei
Alternate members of the 20th Central Committee of the Chinese Communist Party